John Swinburne may refer to:

John Swinburne (by 1526-at least 1577), MP for Northumberland (UK Parliament constituency)
John Swinburne (New York politician) (1820–1889), American legislator and physician
Sir John Swinburne, 6th Baronet (1762–1860)  English politician and patron of the arts
Sir John Swinburne, 7th Baronet (1831–1914), English legislator, High Sheriff of Northumberland, grandson of Sir John Swinburne, 6th Baronet 
John Swinburne (Member of Scottish Parliament) (1930–2017), American-born founder of Scottish Senior Citizens Unity Party (SSCUP)
John Swinburne (cricketer) (born 1939), English cricketer

See also
 Swinburne baronets, five of whom were named John Swinburne
Swinburne (disambiguation)